Dublin North was a parliamentary constituency represented in Dáil Éireann, the lower house of the Irish parliament or Oireachtas, from 1981 to 2016 representing an area in the north of County Dublin (later Fingal). The method of election was proportional representation by means of the single transferable vote (PR-STV).

Boundaries
The constituency was created by the Electoral (Amendment) Act 1980 and was first used at the 1981 general election. It was in the northern area of County Dublin (later Fingal), and included the towns of Balbriggan and Malahide, Lusk, Rush, Donabate and Skerries. It was superseded by Dublin Fingal at the 2016 general election.

TDs

Elections

2011 general election

2007 general election

2002 general election

1998 by-election
Following the resignation of Fianna Fáil TD Ray Burke, a by-election was held on 11 March 1998. The seat was won by the Labour Party candidate Seán Ryan.

1997 general election

1992 general election

1989 general election

1987 general election

November 1982 general election

February 1982 general election

1981 general election

See also
Politics of the Republic of Ireland
Historic Dáil constituencies
Elections in the Republic of Ireland

References

External links
Oireachtas Members Database
Dublin Historic Maps: Townlands of County Dublin

Dáil constituencies in County Dublin (historic)
1981 establishments in Ireland
2016 disestablishments in Ireland
Constituencies established in 1981
Constituencies disestablished in 2016